Midland is a British DJ, producer and record label owner based in London, UK. Real name Harry Agius, he founded his label Graded in 2013 as an output for his own productions.

Biography
Real name Harry Agius, Midland grew up in Tanzania and Greece and attended University in Leeds. In 2003, Agius heard a drum and bass mix tape of Andy C at Slammin' Vinyl, inspiring him to learn the craft of DJing. An avid drum and bass fan, he purchased his first set of Technics turntables and upon moving to Leeds was offered a graveyard slot on the Leeds' local Pirate radio station 'Radio Frequency' under his first moniker, Apt Pupil. He went on to play a nights such as Momentum, Metropolis and Subdub, playing on the Valve Soundsystem warming up for DJs such as Grooverider, Andy C and Dillinja.

Living in Leeds after University, he met likeminded producers and DJs like Pearson Sound, Ben UFO and Pangaea and attended nights such as Exodus, Subdub, Louche, and Back to Basics - which shifted his interest toward slower tempos. This ultimately paved the way for the emergence of the Midland alias. Since then he has become recognised for his ability to shift genres within his mixes, weaving together left field house, techno, rare disco, distinctive sounds from the UK and as a result can be found on lineups with a diverse range of artists every weekend.

In 2013 he founded his label Graded in 2013 as an output for his own productions.

In 2015 founded the sub-label Regraded, the sister imprint focusing on sample led disco and house music releasing music from the likes of Gerd Janson, Shan, Hubie Davison and himself. His first release as Midland was a collaboration with Pearson Sound (then Ramadanman) back in 2010, 'Your Words Matter' on Fink and Will Saul's label Aus Music. He went on to release his 'Play The Game' EP on Phonica Records in the same year, 'Bring Joy' on More Music in 2011, an untitled techno EP with Pariah on Work The Long Nights in 2012. His track 'Trace' on Aus Music became somewhat of a breakthrough in 2013.  Tracks such as Archive 01, Realtime and Drumtrak all followed on his Graded imprint. He has remixed artists such as Mano Le Tough, Darkstar, Lone and Julio Bashmore - and has been remixed by Grain, Leon Vynehall and Motor City Drum Ensemble. In 2018, he founded another sub-label entitled Intergraded, with a focus on emerging artists.

His 2016 track 'Final Credits' became Mixmag's 2016 'Song Of the Year'[4], and in 2016 he was awarded BBC Radio 1's Essential Mix of the Year[5][6] for his 2-hour 2016 mix entry[7].  He has recorded mixes for Fact Magazine, Beats In Space, XLR8R and Resident Advisor amongst others. In 2017 he was announced as the creator of Fabric's 94th instalment of their Fabriclive mix CD series (Fabriclive 94)[10][11][12][13][14], with a launch party in September 2017[15][16]. The mix CD received positive reviews (8.0) from music editorials like Pitchfork[18], DJ Mag (9/10), XLR8R (8/10) [19]and Mixmag (8/10).

In 2018, Midland featured in Resident Advisor's 'Between The Beats' film series, which follows DJs on tour to explore life on the road.

As a touring DJ he's played at some of the most celebrated venues and parties around the world, including Fabric (London), Berghain/Panorama Bar (Berlin), Macarena Club (Barcelona), Concrete (Paris), Electric Pickle (Miami), Jaeger (Oslo), De School (Amsterdam), Le Sucre (Lyon), DC10 (Ibiza) and Pikes Hotel (Ibiza). He's played at a number of festivals including Glastonbury and Field Day (UK), Dekmantel and Lowlands (Netherlands), Let Them Eat Cake (Australia), Love International (Croatia), Montreaux Jazz Festival (Switzerland) and Rob Da Bank's Bestival (UK).

In January 2019, Midland was announced as the cover star of Mixmag magazine's February issue.

Personal life
Midland is gay and uses his social media presence to raise awareness of issues affecting LGBT people. He lives with his husband, Mike, in South London.

Notable Discography

Notable Mixes & Features

References

External links

DJs from London
Year of birth missing (living people)
Living people
English gay musicians
LGBT DJs